Parliamentary elections were held in Morocco on 21 August 1970. They followed the adoption of a new constitution in a referendum in July. The new Assembly of Representatives had 240 members; 90 elected directly in single member constituencies by public ballot, 90 elected by local councillors and 60 elected by four professional colleges (24 by the Chambers of Agriculture, 16 by the Chambers of Commerce
and Industry, 10 by the Chambers of Artisans and 10 by representatives of the wage-earners). The latter two groups were elected on 28 August.

A total of 293 candidates, all of whom were male, contested the election. The Istiqlal Party and the National Union of Popular Forces both boycotted the election, although some candidates still participated. Voter turnout was reported to be 85%.

Results

References

Morocco
1970 in Morocco
Elections in Morocco
Election and referendum articles with incomplete results